Claude-Yves Gosselin (born 19 December 1961, in Caen) is a French racing driver.

Racing record

Complete International Formula 3000 results
(key) (Races in bold indicate pole position) (Races in italics indicate fastest lap)

Complete FIA GT results

24 Hours of Le Mans results

References

1961 births
Living people
French racing drivers
International Formula 3000 drivers
24 Hours of Le Mans drivers
Sportspeople from Caen
Blancpain Endurance Series drivers
European Le Mans Series drivers
FIA GT Championship drivers
Porsche Supercup drivers
EFDA Nations Cup drivers
24 Hours of Spa drivers

TDS Racing drivers
Saintéloc Racing drivers
Boutsen Ginion Racing drivers
Lamborghini Super Trofeo drivers